The Woman King is a 2022 American historical action drama film about the Agojie, the all-female warrior unit that protected the West African kingdom of Dahomey during the 17th to 19th centuries. Set in the 1820s, the film stars Viola Davis as a general who trains the next generation of warriors to fight their enemies. It is directed by Gina Prince-Bythewood and written by Dana Stevens, based on a story she wrote with Maria Bello. The film also stars Thuso Mbedu, Lashana Lynch, Sheila Atim, Hero Fiennes Tiffin, and John Boyega.

Bello conceived the idea for The Woman King in 2015 after visiting Benin, where the kingdom used to be located, and learning the history of the Agojie. She recruited Cathy Schulman to develop it into a feature film, pitching it to several studios, who turned it down due to financial concerns. After they met with TriStar Pictures in 2017, the film was greenlit in 2020. Production began in South Africa in November 2021, shut down due to the COVID-19 Omicron variant a few weeks later, and resumed in early 2022. Polly Morgan was the cinematographer. During post-production, the musical score was composed by Terence Blanchard, and editing was completed by Terilyn A. Shropshire.

The Woman King had its world premiere at the Toronto International Film Festival on September 9, 2022, and Sony Pictures Releasing released the film in theaters in the United States on September 16, 2022. Following the festival screening, the film received positive reviews from critics, with praise directed towards Davis's performance and the action choreography, though it received criticism for historical distortion of slavery. At the 28th Critics' Choice Awards the film received nominations for Best Costume Design, Best Acting Ensemble, Best Director, and Best Actress for Davis. Furthermore, Davis also earned Best Actress nominations at the Golden Globes, Screen Actors Guild, BAFTA Film Awards, and NAACP Image Awards.

Plot
In the West African kingdom of Dahomey in 1823, General Nanisca, leader of the all-female group of warriors, the Agojie, liberates Dahomean women who were abducted by slavers from the Oyo Empire. This provokes King Ghezo of Dahomey to prepare for an all-out war with the Oyo. Nanisca begins to train a new generation of warriors to join the Agojie to protect the kingdom. Among these warriors is Nawi, a strong-willed girl who was offered by her father to the king after refusing to marry men who would beat her. Nawi befriends Izogie, a veteran Agojie. She also reveals to Nanisca that she is adopted and shows a scar on her left shoulder, shocking Nanisca.

Brazilian slave traders led by Santo Ferreira and accompanied by the half-Dahomean Malik arrive as part of an alliance with the Oyo, led by General Oba Ade. Nawi encounters Malik while the latter is bathing, and the two become friends. Shortly after graduating from training to become a full-fledged Agojie, Nawi sneaks off to speak with Malik and learns that the Oyo are planning to attack. She reports this to Nanisca, who tells her off for her recklessness. Nanisca reveals that in her youth, she was captured by Oba, raped, and impregnated. After giving birth to a daughter, Nanisca embedded a shark tooth in her left shoulder before giving her away. Nanisca helps Nawi extract the tooth, confirming that she is her biological daughter.

Nanisca leads the Agojie in an attack on the Oyo. The attack is successful, but Oba escapes and Nawi, Fumbe and Izogie are captured. With Nawi's advice, Fumbe escapes and reports the others' fate to Nanisca. Ghezo prepares to bestow the title of Woman King, his partner and equal in ruling Dahomey, upon Nanisca, but refuses to authorize a rescue mission for the captive Agojie. Meanwhile, Izogie is killed in an escape attempt and Malik buys Nawi to protect her. Nanisca defies orders and sets out with a group of like-minded warriors to rescue the captives. The chaos allows Nawi to escape and rejoin Nanisca. Malik frees several other slaves who drown Ferreira, and Nanisca kills Oba in single combat. The triumphant Agojie return to Dahomey, where Ghezo privately and briefly admonishes Nanisca for disobeying him, before crowning her the Woman King. After the festivities, Nanisca and Nawi privately acknowledge their familial relationship.

Cast

Production

Development

The Woman King was produced by Maria Bello and Cathy Schulman, written by Dana Stevens with contributions by Gina Prince-Bythewood, and directed by Prince-Bythewood. It is a co-production between TriStar Pictures and Entertainment One. 

In 2015, Bello went to the West African nation of Benin to learn the history of the Agojie. Convinced she had found a story worth telling, she returned to Los Angeles and recruited Schulman, then head of organization Women in Film, to help her make the film. On September 19, 2015, Bello used a moment when she was presenting actress Viola Davis with an award at the Skirball Cultural Center in Los Angeles to pitch her idea for the movie in front of the crowd, who cheered at the notion of seeing Davis in the lead role.

Schulman first tried to set up the film at STX Films, where she was the head of the production, but the studio was only willing to offer an unsatisfactory $5 million. After leaving STX in 2016, Schulman worked with Bello, Davis, and Julius Tennon, Davis's husband and producing partner at JuVee Productions, to take the idea elsewhere. 

Studios who turned it down cited an unlikely chance for the film to turn a profit; others, according to Davis, wanted to cast light-skinned, well-known actresses, which they refused to do for historical accuracy and the audience's sake. Prince-Bythewood, also in 2016, was approached to write the screenplay but could not commit due to a scheduling conflict with Silver & Black. In 2017, without a script or director, the producers met with TriStar's then-chief Hannah Minghella and then-senior vice president Nicole Brown. Within two years, Brown had taken over Minghella's position and made The Woman King one of TriStar's top priorities. 

In early 2018, the commercial success of the superhero movie Black Panther, which featured a fictionalized version of the Agojie, further motivated the crew to move forward with the project. In March 2018, Davis and Lupita Nyong'o were announced to star; Nyong'o's role was ultimately played by Thuso Mbedu. Prince-Bythewood read the screenplay once it was completed and came on board to direct, and in 2020, The Woman King was greenlit with a $50 million budget.

Prince-Bythewood referenced epic films like The Last of the Mohicans (1992), Braveheart (1995), and Gladiator (2000) as influences. Her background in sports gave her a perspective on the realism of fight scenes. In crafting the story, she sought for the women to be multi-faceted in both their fighting ability and their emotional reactions. She worked with production designer Akin McKenzie to learn about the Agojie. Their research included books, out-of-print texts, photographs, and writings by Princeton professor Leonard Wantchekon. "The biggest eye-opener," she said, "was how much misinformation there is about these women and this culture, given that so much of their history was written from the colonizer's point of view. So it was really about separating the texts that were from that point of view, which were so disparaging and disrespectful, from the truth." 

For four months before the shoot, the cast performed 90 minutes a day of weight lifting with trainer Gabriela Mclain, followed by three and a half hours of fight training with stunt coordinator Danny Hernandez, which included running, martial arts, and working with swords and spears. Davis was inspired by pro boxer Claressa Shields.

Filming

In November 2021, the cast and crew flew to South Africa for a five-month shoot. Prince-Bythewood prioritized department heads who were women and people of color, including cinematographer Polly Morgan, production designer Akin McKenzie, costume designer Gersha Phillips, hairstylist Louisa Anthony, visual effects supervisor Sara Bennett, and editor Terilyn Shropshire. Makeup was handled by a local, South African artist, Babalwa Mtshiselwa. "The thing is for women and people of color," Prince-Bythewood said, "often the résumés are not long because it's about lack of opportunity, not lack of talent. So when you’re in my position, it's important to look past that résumé."

For a sequence in which a character is remembering a sexual assault, Prince-Bythewood referenced Christine Blasey Ford's testimony at Brett Kavanaugh's Supreme Court nomination hearing and asked the actress to read the Roxane Gay book Hunger, a memoir about Gay's rape. Filming for the first two weeks took place in the coastal province of KwaZulu-Natal for the shooting of jungle scenes. They then moved to the capital city of Cape Town, where the majority of filming would take place. In their third week in South Africa, the COVID-19 omicron variant hit the production; Davis and Tennon were among the infected. Production shut down for a few weeks and resumed in mid-January 2022. This production halt forced them to re-rehearse a battle sequence with hundreds of performers. Prince-Bythewood called it the hardest shoot of her career.

Post-production
Editing was completed by Terilyn A. Shropshire, who worked on Prince-Bythewood's The Old Guard (2020). The film's musical score was composed by Terence Blanchard, who worked with Prince-Bythewood on her first film Love & Basketball (2000) and the television shows Shots Fired and Swagger. For the score, Blanchard enlisted the nine-voice Vox Noire ensemble, who worked with him on his opera Fire Shut Up in My Bones, with jazz singer Dianne Reeves as his soloist. They recorded for five days with the 78-member Royal Scottish National Orchestra in Glasgow, Scotland. Additional recordings occurred in New York with Vox Noire and Colorado with Reeves. Ghanaian-American mezzo-soprano Tesia Kwarteng led the choir. Three numbers by South African composer Lebo M. of chants and dances were also performed in the film. The song in the end credits, "Keep Rising," was an original piece written by Jessy Wilson, Jeremy Lutito, and Angélique Kidjo and performed by Kidjo for Warner Chappell Music in late 2020, and later sold to Sony. The soundtrack album was released on September 16, 2022, by Milan Records.

Release
The film premiered at the Toronto International Film Festival on September 9, 2022. It was released in theaters on September 16, 2022, by Sony Pictures Releasing. Sony handled distribution worldwide except in Canada and the United Kingdom, where distribution was held by Entertainment One.

The film was released for VOD on November 22, 2022, followed by a Blu-ray, DVD, and 4K UHD release by Sony Pictures Home Entertainment on December 13, 2022 in the United States. In the United Kingdom, it would be released on DVD and Blu-ray, by Entertainment One and Universal Pictures Home Entertainment (through Warner Bros. Home Entertainment), on February 13, 2023.

Netflix in the United States received The Woman King 153 days after its theatrical release on February 16, 2023  as part of a first window deal with Sony Pictures and a second window deal with Disney+.

Reception

Box office
The Woman King grossed $67.3 million in the United States and Canada, and $27.1 million in other territories, for a worldwide total of $94.4 million.

In the United States and Canada, The Woman King was projected to gross around $12 million in its opening weekend, with some studios estimating it could reach as much as $16 million. The film made $6.8 million on its first day, including $1.7 million from Thursday night previews. It went on to over-perform and debut at $19.05 million from 3,765 theaters, topping the box office. Of the opening weekend audience, 60% were female, 58% were over the age of 35, and 59% were African-American. In its second weekend, the film made $11.1 million (a drop of 42%), finishing behind newcomer Don't Worry Darling. In its third weekend, the film made $6.8 million, finishing third.

Critical response

The Woman King received positive reviews from critics for the cast's performance, including Viola Davis's starring role and Thuso Mbedu's breakout performance, and its action choreography, while some minor disappointment was expressed with the script.   Audiences polled by CinemaScore gave the film a rare average grade of "A+" on an A+ to F scale, while those at PostTrak gave the film a 95% overall positive score.

Lovia Gyarkye of The Hollywood Reporter wrote, "A crowd-pleasing epic think Braveheart with Black women." Robert Daniels at RogerEbert.com said, "When The Woman King works, it's majestic... The magnitude and the awe this movie inspires are what epics like Gladiator and Braveheart are all about." Kate Erbland of IndieWire said, "A hell of a time at the movies, a seemingly 'niche' topic with great appeal, the sort of battle-heavy feature that will likely engender plenty of hoots and hollers." /Films Chris Evangelista said it was "an absolute blast. It's a film that isn't afraid to get you cheering." BBC critic Caryn James wrote, "It is a splashy popcorn movie with a social conscience."

Jamie Broadnax of Black Girl Nerds called Viola Davis's performance a career best. Gyarkye said, "The Oscar-winning actress, known for digging into her characters' psyches, accesses an impressive level of emotional depth and nuance as Nanisca." The Wraps Martin Tsai wrote, "Davis truly gets to flex the full range of her acting chops. A performance of this caliber is rare in what's essentially an action flick." Chris Bumbray of JoBlo wrote, "Her raw intensity is backed up by a newly jacked physique that makes her an imposing action heroine, and she performs exceptionally well in the numerous action scenes." Other cast members that were praised included Lashana Lynch (Evangelista at /Film and Reuben Baron at Looper.com called her the film's standout) and Thuso Mbedu, who was called a "breakout star"  by several critics; Tim Grierson at Screen International said she "nearly steals the show" with an "exceptional supporting performance".

James said representation of history and culture "leans toward fantasy in its heroic moments, but is rooted in [the] truth about war, brutality, and freedom." Gyarkye said it "begins as portraiture and then surrenders to melodrama when faced with the challenges of translating history for the screen and constructing a coherent geopolitical thread." Reuben Baron of Looper.com wrote, "The Woman King is an 8/10 for entertainment value, and 4/10 for how it deals with history." On the aspect of spectacle, critics said they wanted more action movies like The Woman King. Erbland said, "If this is what a Hollywood-ized and -sized blockbuster looks like in 2022, bring it on. Bring them all on." Evangelista concluded in his review, "Maybe one day we'll get to a point where such a movie doesn't feel groundbreaking, but here we are."

Accolades

Historical inaccuracies 

The Woman King is set in the kingdom of Dahomey in the year 1823. The kingdom existed from around 1600 through 1904, and the Agojie existed for most of that time.

Characters 

Viola Davis plays the Agojie general Nanisca, who is fictional. History vs. Hollywood speculated her name was inspired by an Agojie teenage recruit of the same name who was written about by a French naval officer in 1889. John Boyega plays King Ghezo, a real-life figure who ruled Dahomey from 1818 to 1858 and engaged in the Atlantic slave trade through the end of his reign. Hero Fiennes Tiffin plays the white Portuguese-speaking slave trader Santo Ferreira who is fictional and portrayed as an enemy to Ghezo. History vs. Hollywood said the character was "possibly loosely inspired" by Francisco Félix de Sousa, a Brazilian slave trader who came to prominence in Dahomey after an 1810 agreement between Dahomey and Portugal that slaves only be sold from Portuguese aligned ports. After his imprisonment by Adandozan, Ghezo’s predecessor, De Sousa would help in a coup to bring Ghezo to power.

Role in slavery 

Historically, Dahomey was a kingdom that conquered other African states and enslaved their citizens to sell in the Atlantic slave trade. According to Patrick Manning, a professor of world history at the University of Pittsburgh, the lowest and highest estimates place the share of external slave trade in Dahomey's economy at between 2.5% and 15%:

The proportion of trans-Atlantic trade to domestic product for Dahomey has averaged about 15% since the late seventeenth century. The proportion varied with time, of course: it rose from a very low level before the slave trade to a level much higher than the average (for the Aja at least) during the worst years of depopulation and during the high-price years of the eighteenth century. But in the longer run the relationship stabilized, as slave exports declined and domestic production recovered.

Human sacrifice played a prominent role in the Dahomey political and religious institutions. Every year, around 500 criminals, war captives and slaves would be sacrificed in what was referred to as the Annual Customs of Dahomey. As many as 4,000 people were reported killed in one of these ceremonies in 1727. The Agojie had a history of participating in slave raiding, and slavery in Dahomey persisted even after the British Empire stopped Dahomey from continuing in the Atlantic slave trade. The Agojie also had a central part in the Annual Customs. 

In the film's setting of the 1820s, Nanisca confronts Ghezo about the immorality of selling Dahomey slaves to the Portuguese and suggests trading in palm oil production instead. Nanisca being fictional, the confrontation did not take place. Smithsonian wrote, "Though Ghezo did at one point explore palm oil production as an alternative source of revenue, it proved far less lucrative, and the king soon resumed Dahomey's participation in the slave trade."

Following the announcement that she would star in the movie, Lupita Nyong'o became involved in production of the documentary, Warrior Women with Lupita Nyong'o.  Over the course of filming of the documentary, Nyong'o learned the extent of Agojie involvement in the Atlantic slave trade, later relating, "The Agojie women were involved in the slave trade and that has changed the dynamics and polarization of Benin to this day."  Several sources have speculated Nyong'o's departure from the making of The Woman King was due to her experience making Warrior Women with Lupita Nyong'o.

Dahomey's enemies 

At the film's onset in the 1820s, as in real life, Dahomey is a tributary state of the Oyo Empire, which it had become in 1730. As portrayed in the film, Dahomey fought successfully to be freed from its status under Oyo. Also in the film, European colonization is a threat to Dahomey, but in real life, territorial disputes began with France in 1863 and led to the First Franco-Dahomean War in 1890, followed by the Second Franco-Dahomean War in 1892. France defeated Dahomey in 1894 and colonized it, and the kingdom became part of French Dahomey.

Notes

References

Further reading 

 The warriors of this West African kingdom were formidable—and female at National Geographic, September 14, 2022

External links
 
 Official screenplay
 

2020s American films
2020s English-language films
2020s historical action films
2022 action films
Action films based on actual events
American epic films
American films based on actual events
American historical action films
Entertainment One films
Films about royalty
Films directed by Gina Prince-Bythewood
Films impacted by the COVID-19 pandemic
Films scored by Terence Blanchard
Films set in 1823
Films set in Benin
Films shot in KwaZulu-Natal
Films shot in the Western Cape
TriStar Pictures films
IMAX films
TSG Entertainment films
Films about slavery
Kingdom of Dahomey